Molecular descriptors play a fundamental role in chemistry, pharmaceutical sciences, environmental protection policy, and health researches, as well as in quality control, being the way molecules, thought of as real bodies, are transformed into numbers, allowing some mathematical treatment of the chemical information contained in the molecule. This was defined by Todeschini and Consonni as:

"The molecular descriptor is the final result of a logic and mathematical procedure which transforms chemical information encoded within a symbolic representation of a molecule into a useful number or the result of some standardized experiment."

By this definition, the molecular descriptors are divided into two main categories: experimental measurements, such as log P, molar refractivity, dipole moment, polarizability, and, in general, additive physico-chemical properties, and theoretical molecular descriptors, which are derived from a symbolic representation of the molecule and can be further classified according to the different types of molecular representation.

The main classes of theoretical molecular descriptors are: 1) 0D-descriptors (i.e. constitutional descriptors, count descriptors), 2) 1D-descriptors (i.e. list of structural fragments, fingerprints),3) 2D-descriptors (i.e. graph invariants),4) 3D-descriptors (such as, for example, 3D-MoRSE descriptors, WHIM descriptors, GETAWAY descriptors, quantum-chemical descriptors, size, steric, surface and volume descriptors),5) 4D-descriptors (such as those derived from GRID or CoMFA methods, Volsurf).

Invariance properties of molecular descriptors 
The invariance properties of molecular descriptors can be defined as the ability of the algorithm for their calculation to give a descriptor value that is independent of the particular characteristics of the molecular representation, such as atom numbering or labeling, spatial reference frame, molecular conformations, etc. Invariance to molecular numbering or labeling is assumed as a minimal basic requirement for any descriptor.

Two other important invariance properties, translational invariance and rotational invariance, are the invariance of a descriptor value to any translation or rotation of the molecules in the chosen reference frame. These last invariance properties are required for the 3D-descriptors.

Degeneracy of molecular descriptors 
This property refers to the ability of a descriptor to avoid equal values for different molecules. 
In this sense, descriptors can show no degeneracy at all, low, intermediate, or high degeneracy. 
For example, the number of molecule atoms and the molecular weights are high degeneracy descriptors, while, usually, 3D-descriptors show low or no degeneracy at all.

Basic requirements for optimal descriptors 

 Should have structural interpretation
 Should have good correlation with at least one property
 Should preferably discriminate among isomers
 Should be possible to apply to local structure
 Should be possible to generalize to "higher" descriptors
 Should be simple
 Should not be based on experimental properties
 Should not be trivially related to other descriptors
 Should be possible to construct efficiently
 Should use familiar structural concepts
 Should change gradually with gradual changes in structures
 Should have the correct size dependence, if related to the molecule size

Software for molecular descriptors calculation

Here there is a list of a selection of commercial and free descriptor calculation tools.

See also
Mathematical chemistry
Topological index
QSAR
Applicability domain
Chemical database
Docking (molecular)
Cahn-Ingold-Prelog priority rule

References

Further reading 

 Roberto Todeschini and Viviana Consonni, Molecular Descriptors for Chemoinformatics (2 volumes), Wiley-VCH, 2009.
 Mati Karelson, Molecular Descriptors in QSAR/QSPR, John Wiley & Sons, 2000.
 James Devillers and Alexandru T. Balaban (Eds.), Topological indices and related descriptors in QSAR and QSPR. Taylor & Francis, 2000.
 Lemont Kier and Lowell Hall, Molecular structure description. Academic Press, 1999.
 Alexandru T. Balaban (Ed.), From chemical topology to three-dimensional geometry. Plenum Press, 1997

Cheminformatics
Mathematical chemistry